Claudio Marcelo Elías  (born 23 September 1974 in Montevideo) is a former Uruguayan footballer.

International career
Elías made four appearances for the senior Uruguay national football team during 1995. He made his debut on March 22, 1995 in a friendly match against Colombia (2-1 loss) in the Estadio Atanasio Girardot in Medellín.

See also
Football in Uruguay
List of football clubs in Uruguay

References
Notes

Sources

1974 births
Living people
Uruguayan footballers
Uruguayan expatriate footballers
Uruguay international footballers
Footballers from Montevideo
C.A. Progreso players
Central Español players
Centro Atlético Fénix players
Deportivo Maldonado players
Wuhan Guanggu players
Tianjin Jinmen Tiger F.C. players
América de Cali footballers
Rangers de Talca footballers
C.D. Universidad Católica del Ecuador footballers
Uruguayan Primera División players
Chilean Primera División players
Categoría Primera A players
Expatriate footballers in Chile
Expatriate footballers in China
Expatriate footballers in Brazil
Expatriate footballers in Ecuador
Expatriate footballers in Colombia
Uruguayan expatriate sportspeople in Chile
Uruguayan expatriate sportspeople in China
Uruguayan expatriate sportspeople in Brazil
Uruguayan expatriate sportspeople in Ecuador
Uruguayan expatriate sportspeople in Colombia
Association football defenders